Dianin's compound (4-p-hydroxyphenyl-2,2,4-trimethylchroman) was first prepared by Aleksandr Dianin in 1914. This compound is a condensation isomer of bisphenol A and acetone and of special importance in host–guest chemistry because it can form a large variety of clathrates with suitable guest molecules. One example is the clathrate of Dianin's compound with morpholine. Slow evaporation of a solution containing both organic compounds yields crystals. Each asymmetric unit cell making up the crystal contains six chroman molecules of which two are deprotonated and two protonated morpholine molecules. The six chroman molecules are racemate pairs.

References

Clathrates
Phenols
Russian inventions
Chromanes